Prize Wali Paathshala is an Indian Hindi-language interactive game show that debuted on video steaming platform Flipkart Video on December 15, 2020. It is a Flipkart Video original series hosted by Sugandha Mishra and Garvit Pareek.

Overview 
Prize Wali Paathshala is a web series that takes viewers back to school days while teaching basic school subjects. It is a daily show that features Sugandha as Sonam Gupta and Garvit as Chintu. Chintu will be seen teaching the much older student, Sonam Gupta aka Sugandha Mishra basic school subjects, general knowledge, and her favorite topic, Bollywood. Following which viewers will be asked three questions with four options and fifteen seconds will be given for each question. They have to give correct answers in order to win prizes from Flipkart.

Cast 
 Inayat Verma as Jr. Teacher
 Mohena Singh as Alia What
 Garvit Pareek as Principal G.
 Divyanka Tripathi as Zara Khan
 Raghav Juyal as Samman Khan
 Mubeen Saudagar as Roonil Shetty
 Sudesh Lehri as Bad Boy Shaan
 Bharti Singh as Maths Teacher
 Sunil Grover as English Teacher
 Mukti Mohan as Kajal
 Tushar Kalia as Ranveer King

Cameos
 Gauahar Khan
 Hina Khan
 Kushal Tandon
 Karan Patel
 Kamya Panjabi
 Sharad Malhotra
 Karan Mehra
 Kratika Sengar
 Surbhi Jyoti
 Vivian Dsena as Angry Bird
 Deepika Singh
 Erica Fernandes

Production 
The official teaser of Prize Wali Paathshala was released on December 4, 2020, on the official YouTube of Flipkart which featured Sugandha and Garvit. In the promo, Sugandha is seen studying hard and diligently to learn the answers to general knowledge questions while Garvit is correcting her. Prize Wali Paathshala is set to be premiered on Flipkart app on December 15, 2020.

References

External links 
 
 

2020 web series debuts
Hindi-language web series
Indian game shows
Quiz shows
2020 Indian television series debuts
Interactive films
Flipkart
Indian reality television series